Shumikha is the name of several inhabited localities in Russia.

Urban localities
Shumikha, Kurgan Oblast, a town in Shumikhinsky District of Kurgan Oblast

Rural localities
Shumikha, Altai Krai, a selo in Togulsky Selsoviet of Togulsky District of Altai Krai
Shumikha, Irkutsk Oblast, a settlement in Slyudyansky District of Irkutsk Oblast
Shumikha, Krasnoyarsk Krai, a village in Kucherdayevsky Selsoviet of Ilansky District of Krasnoyarsk Krai
Shumikha, Novosibirsk Oblast, a village in Bolotninsky District of Novosibirsk Oblast
Shumikha, Karagaysky District, Perm Krai, a settlement in Karagaysky District, Perm Krai
Shumikha, Nytvensky District, Perm Krai, a village in Nytvensky District, Perm Krai
Shumikha, Pskov Oblast, a village in Bezhanitsky District of Pskov Oblast
Shumikha, Sverdlovsk Oblast, a village in Prigorodny District of Sverdlovsk Oblast